Ariphrades is a genus of moths of the family Erebidae. The genus was erected by Herbert Druce in 1891.

Species
Ariphrades plumigera Dognin, 1914 Paraguay
Ariphrades setula H. Druce, 1891 Panama

References

Hypeninae